Wiser and Weaker is a single by Deniece Williams released in 1986 on Columbia Records. The song reached No. 24 on the Billboard Dance Club Songs chart.

Background
Wiser and Weaker was produced by Greg Mathieson who composed the song alongside Deniece Williams and Fritz Baskett.

Critical reception
Harry Rich of The Morning Call called the song "danceworthy, and dazzlingly aggressive".

Credits
source: 

 Julia Waters – backing vocals
 Maxine Waters – backing vocals
 Oren Waters – backing vocals
 "Ready" Freddie Washington – bass
 Carlos Vega – drums
 Michael Landau – guitar
 Paul Jackson Jr. – guitar
 Tommy Mandel – additional keyboards
 Greg Mathieson – keyboards, synthesizer
 Lenny Castro – percussion
 Steve Thompson – additional producer, remix
 Michael Barbiero – additional producer, remix

References

1986 songs
1986 singles
Deniece Williams songs
Columbia Records singles